Robert Davenport may refer to:

 Robert Davenport (dramatist) (fl. 1623–1639), English dramatist
 Robert Davenport (Australian politician) (1816–1896), pioneer and politician in the Colony of South Australia
 Robert Davenport (cricketer) (1852–1934), New Zealand cricketer
 Robert Davenport (Royal Navy officer) (1882–1965), Commander-in-Chief, Coast of Scotland
 Robert Davenport (Family Affairs), a character from the British soap opera Family Affairs

See also
 Bob Davenport (disambiguation)